Pan Sukhum, better known by the noble title Chaophraya Yommarat (1862 – 30 December 1938), was a Thai government official who served several senior positions under the governments of kings Chulalongkorn (Rama V) and Vajiravudh (Rama VI).

Born in Suphan Buri, Pan was raised as a novice Buddhist monk in Bangkok and left the monkhood to join government service around the age of 21, becoming a teacher at the royal palace school and then a tutor to Chulalongkorn's children studying in England, where he served as a diplomat for 11 years. He then became commissioner of Monthon Nakhon Si Thammarat under the new monthon administration system for 12 years, and was later appointed to several successive ministerships in the reformed government system: those of Public Works, Metropolitan Affairs, and Interior. He oversaw various modernizing public works projects, including the introduction of electricity and waterworks in the capital and the establishment of a modern police force, and also established the country's first cement factory (now Siam Cement Group). He was elevated to the highest noble rank of chaophraya, receiving the title Yommarat, in 1908. He retired from public office in 1926, but was later appointed regent to the young King Ananda Mahidol (Rama VIII) in 1935, holding the position until his death in 1938.

Chao Phraya Yommarat Hospital, the main hospital of Suphan Buri Province is named after him.

References

Chaophraya
Ministers of Interior of Thailand
Government ministers of Thailand
Regents of Thailand
Thai diplomats
1862 births
1938 deaths